The following is a list of Malayalam films released in the year 1982.

Dubbed films

References

 1982
1982
Malayalam
Fil